Holden Greiner (born March 25, 1991) is a retired basketball player. Greiner usually plays as forward. He played four seasons for the Lehigh Mountain Hawks men's basketball team.

College career
As a junior at Lehigh, Greiner posted 9.4 points per game as Lehigh reached the NCAA Tournament. Greiner averaged 13.2 points and 6.7 rebounds per game as a senior. He took over much of the scoring after CJ McCollum was sidelined by a foot injury. Greiner helped lead Lehigh to a berth in the College Basketball Invitational tournament.

Professional career
On 17 July 2013 he signed with the Dutch team Landstede Basketbal from Zwolle.

For the 2014–15 season, Greiner signed with AEK Larnaca in Cyprus.

Greiner signed a training camp deal with the London Lightning of the National Basketball League of Canada (NBL) for the 2015–16 season. He joined the team in an exhibition game against Raptors 905 of the NBA Development League on November 9, 2015. Greiner appeared on the starting lineup, but the Lightning lost the contest, 111–126.

Honours
Landstede Zwolle
DBL All-Star (1): 2014

References

External links
Eurobasket.com profile 
ESPN Profile

1991 births
Living people
AEK Larnaca B.C. players
American expatriate basketball people in the Netherlands
Basketball players from Michigan
Dutch Basketball League players
Landstede Hammers players
Lehigh Mountain Hawks men's basketball players
People from Traverse City, Michigan
Power forwards (basketball)
Small forwards
American men's basketball players